Bessie Banks (born Bessie Estelle Naylor) was an American actress and screenwriter active in Hollywood during the silent era.

Biography 
Bessie was born in Worthington, Minnesota, to Stephen Naylor and Harriet Lynch. Both of her parents were from Britain. The family relocated to Santa Barbara, California, when Bessie was a girl. In Santa Barbara, she met and married her husband, Canadian actor Perry Banks; together, they performed as a vaudeville act and appeared in a number of films produced in Santa Barbara at "Flying A" Studios.

Selected filmography 
As screenwriter:

 The Beggar Child (1914)

As actress:

 Dulcie's Adventure (1916)
 The Stinger Stung (1916)
 Youth's Endearing Charm (1916)
 The Madonna of the Night (1916)
 Love's Bitter Strength (1916)
 A Modern Knight (1916)
 Billy Van Deusen's Wedding Eve (1916)
 Some Night (1916)
 To Rent Furnished (1915)
 Billy Van Deusen's Campaign (1915)
 Deserted at the Auto (1915)
 A Disciple of Nietzsche (1915)
 Cats, Cash and a Cook Book (1915)
 The House of a Thousand Scandals (1915)
 In Trust (1915)
 Uncle Heck, by Heck! (1915)
 His Mysterious Profession (1915)
 A Woman Scorned (1915)
 When a Woman Waits (1914)
 The Ruin of Manley (1914)

References

External Links
 

1887 births
1969 deaths
American film actresses
Vaudeville performers
People from Worthington, Minnesota
Actresses from Minnesota